Stictosia decubitana is a moth in the family Erebidae first described by Francis Walker in 1863. It is found on Borneo. The habitat consists of lowland areas.

References

Moths described in 1863
Nudariina